Pankajärvi is a medium-sized lake in the Vuoksi main catchment area. It is located in the North Karelia region, in the municipality of Lieksa in Finland.

See also
List of lakes in Finland

References

North Karelia
Lakes of Lieksa